is a 2013 documentary from Japan, on noted Ramen Chef Kazuo Yamagishi. The documentary is narrated by Shōsuke Tanihara. The documentary follows 13 years in the life of Yamagishi, examining his long career, and covering his health and business challenges in his later life, as well as the impact his work has had on Ramen in Japan. The documentary was directed by Takashi Innami. The documentary revealed some of the truths that Yamagishi had kept for years, and the heavy physical and emotional burden that he persists with, in his ongoing career as a Ramen chef. The documentary addresses what drives him to continue making Ramen, despite the serious series of debilitating medical issues that slowly erode his ability to work as a chef. The film has been chosen for a number of International Film Festivals

Production 
The film initially came out of a three part series broadcast on Fuji TV on Yamagishi, in 2012. Fuji TV's “The Nonfiction” 3 episode documentary was well received in Japan, and won the Silver Screen Award at the US International Film & Video Festival. It covered similar topics and challenges of the famed Ramen Chef. The documentary began filming in 2000, and revisited Yamagishi every couple of years, following up on his life and the challenges to his business.

His apprentices are often interviewed as part of the show. While overall cooperative, Yamagishi did deny access to some areas of the shop for filming, for sentimental reasons, which are then later revealed in the demolition of the shop.

The documentary was directed by Takashi Innami and written by Hiromitsu Iwaida. Duration is 97 minutes.

Soundtrack 
Famed composer Joe Hisaishi created the theme music for the documentary, based on what he saw were the strengths and themes of  Yamagishi, and his lifelong contributions to Ramen in Japan. Additional music for the documentary was created by Kôji Takata, and complemented Hisashi's contribution.

Synopsis 
The documentary begins showing Kazuo Yamagishi Ramen restaurant, “Taishoken” (formally “East Ikebukuro Taishoken” is known for its endless lines.) in 2001. The restaurant is extremely busy, and interviews with people on a long waiting queue indicate people's passion for Yamagishi's Ramen. Some people have been waiting for 2 hours. INside the shop, the shops is busy and the narrator notes that chairs are never empty.

Yamagishi was born 1934 in Nagano Prefecture, and began making Ramen, deciding to dedicate his life to it at the age of 17.   Yamagishi created a special dish called “morisoba” (mountain of noodles) in 1995, which is considered the origin of the now hugely popular “tsukemen” or dipping noodles. He opened Taishoken in East Ikebukuro in 1961 and became famous as the owner of the ramen shop that people lined up for.  Yamagishi started his restaurant in the 1960s with his wife, after moving to Tokyo from Yamanouchi Town in the Shiga Highlands, northern Nagano Prefecture. His wife died with she was 52, some years ago, the two had a close relationship and had known each other since they were 3.

Yamagishi trains multiple apprentices, who come from all walks of life and stay various time periods. He is obviously generous with their time, and although the apprentices are there, Yamagishi himself does a lot of the work because of space restrictions. He is well respected by his apprentices for this, and his customers, some of whom have been coming to his shop for decades, and the apprentices note without exception, the main reason people flock to Taishoken is Yamagishi who they endearingly refer to as “the boss.”

As the documentary progresses, it is clear he has had locked up memories of his wife, who supported him for much of his life, and his main purpose now is to continue making Ramen.

One day, the Ramen shop is unusually closed. Yamagishi has gone to the hospital. The surgeon points out to him that he has osteoporosis in his hands, where there is little cartilage between his fingers. His knees are even worse, with little cartilage left, and the bones are rubbing together. The doctor notes he needs to take it easy and stop working and have an operation, otherwise his condition will worsen to the point where he won't be able to stand or walk. To complicate matters, Yamagishi is overweight.

The narrator returns to the shop some months later and Yamagishi has basically ignored his doctor's advice and continued working at the shop making Ramen, at his normal pace. The narrator notes a hidden back room, covered by bags, and raises this with Yamagishi. He at first avoids the topic, then reveals it was the bedroom of his wife. He tells them that he doesn't want it on camera, and will stop the documentary if they persist, or go upstairs which also is private. Yamagishi has an apartment nearby, but instead sleeps in the restaurant.

The documentary makes a return to Yamagishi after some time and finds that his health is worse. He has put on more weight, and he has varicose veins so his legs have swollen. Eventually he is finding it hard to walk, and is not in the shop as much. He is also finding it hard to breathe. He collapses and is taken to hospital, where he has surgery. Yamagishi is not keen on the surgery, but has it so he can return to doing the one thing he wants to do, make ramen.

While Yamagishi is in hospital, Taishoken takes a downturn. The apprentices are now running the shop and find it difficult to run the store, and he has not left a natural successor. It is evident Taishoken is all about Yamagishi, and with him absent, the quests disappear and it starts to lose money.

After 6 months, Yamagishi is now out of hospital, lost weight and able to stand and work. He triumphantly returns to work, and gets back to what he loves doing, making ramen. However, while he can now stand, he has pains in his fingers. The show returns to find he was not at work the next day, and after some time, he still hasn't returned to work. Visiting him at his house, he admits he can't make Ramen because of the pain in his fingers.

The documentary shows some of the success of his apprentices, after they have left working with him. Many of them are now successful Ramen Chefs, with their own businesses. One in particular has a chain of 15 Ramen shops, which is hugely successful. He noted his success all comes down to his training with Yamagishi. Many of them use the connection to Taishoken and him in their advertising. Many of them refer to their own business as “Taishoken” branded shops, Yamagishi hasn't copyrighted the name, and has no franchise, so there are no restrictions and he doesn't benefit financially.

Eventually, Taishoken is sold to make way for new apartments. An apartment in the new complex is purchased for him by his apprentices, some of whom have gone on to be wildly successful because of his training,  The apprentices regularly visit him with their children, and Yamagishi is evidently content with his life and what he has achieved. The documentary finishes with a montage of the now many “Taishoken” shops in existence, including the successor to his own, a new larger shop in East Ibukoro. In it, in pride of position, is a picture of cats he had bought for his wife, that had been in the original shop for 52 years.

Cast 

 Shōsuke Tanihara - Narrator
 Kazuo Yamagishi - as himself

Production staff 

 Kazuya Ajitani - Executive Producer
 Akira Nishimura - Producer
 Toshihiro Yamada - Producer

Festivals/awards 
Shown at:
 The International Japanese Film Festival 2022 
 The Powell Street Film Festival 
 Hawaii International Film Festival - 2013 
 Eiga Sai - 9th Festival of Japanese Film and Culture 2016

References

Further reading

External links 
Trailer on Youtube
 

2013 films
2013 documentary films
2010s Japanese films
2010s Japanese-language films
Japanese documentary films
Japanese satirical films
Cooking films
Films about food and drink
Films set in Tokyo
Films set in restaurants